James Hubert Pierce (August 8, 1900 – December 11, 1983) was an American actor and the fourth actor to portray Tarzan on film. He appeared in films from 1924 to 1951.

Background 
Pierce was born in Freedom, Indiana. He was an All-American center on the Indiana Hoosiers football team.  Following his graduation in 1921, he coached high school football in Arizona, and began acting in his spare time. After he was cast in the 1923 production of The Deerslayer, he remained in California and coached football at Glendale High School (one of his players was John Wayne).

Career

Portrayal of Tarzan 
Pierce's life changed when he attended a party given by Edgar Rice Burroughs and his daughter Joan. Burroughs, the creator and author of the Tarzan books, immediately wanted Pierce to star in the next Tarzan movie. Pierce gave up a role in the film Wings to accept the Tarzan role.  His part in Wings was given to a newcomer named Gary Cooper. The silent Tarzan film Burroughs talked him into accepting was released in 1927 by RKO Radio Pictures, and entitled Tarzan and the Golden Lion.

Later career 
Pierce is also remembered for playing Prince Thun of the Lion Men in the 1936 serial film Flash Gordon. He acted in small roles in several films, mostly westerns, through 1951, and worked in a lucrative real estate agency in the San Fernando Valley. He was an accomplished pilot, active during World War II with the National Airmen's Reserve, the forerunner of today's Air National Guard.

Personal life and death 

Pierce wed Joan Burroughs on August 8, 1928, his 28th birthday. From 1932 to 1936, James and Joan Pierce were the voices of Tarzan and Jane on national radio in Tarzan. They had a daughter Joanne II Anselmo, née Pierce (1930–2005), and a son James Michael Pierce (1935–1984). They remained married until Joan's death in 1972. Both are buried in Forest Hill Cemetery Shelbyville, Shelbyville, Indiana, and their tombstones bear the inscriptions Tarzan and Jane. 

For many years, near the end of his life, Pierce attempted, to no avail, to find a print of Tarzan and the Golden Lion, which was thought lost. After his death, a copy was found in a foreign archive.

Selected filmography

References

External links

 
 

1900 births
1983 deaths
20th-century American male actors
American football centers
American male film actors
American male silent film actors
American male radio actors
Indiana Hoosiers football players
High school football coaches in California
People from Shelbyville, Indiana
Male actors from Indiana
Players of American football from Indiana
Male Western (genre) film actors